Hollern may refer to the following places: 

In Austria
Hollern, part of Rohrau, Lower Austria

In Germany
Hollern-Twielenfleth, a municipality in Lower Saxony
Hollern, a part of Unterschleißheim, Bavaria
Gut Hollern, a part of Eching, Bavaria

See also 
 Kate Hollern (born 1955), British Labour Party politician, Member of Parliament (MP) for Blackburn since 2015